Coulter (also known as Coulters, formerly also Coulterville or Coultersville) is an unincorporated community in South Versailles Township, Allegheny County, Pennsylvania, United States.

The community occupies land warranted in 1787 to Eli Coulter. This land was conveyed by patent in 1855 to Margaret Coulter, who laid out a village in 1858. Coultersville was a coal mining village until early in the 20th century when the local mines were depleted and closed.

Coulter has a post office, with ZIP code 15028. Established in 1864 as Duncan, the post office was renamed Coultersville in 1894 and Coulters in 1900.

Transportation

The CSX Keystone Subdivision runs through Coulter along a former B&O line that was originally laid by the Pittsburgh and Connellsville Railroad.

Notable people

People born in Coulter include Pittsburgh Steelers founder Art Rooney and baseball player Joe "Moon" Harris.

References

Unincorporated communities in Allegheny County, Pennsylvania
Unincorporated communities in Pennsylvania